Rhinolekos is a genus of armored catfishes native to South America. This genus is only known from the Tocantizinho River and Paranaiba River drainage in Goiás, Brazil.

Species
There are currently 4 recognized species in this genus:
 Rhinolekos britskii Martins, Langeani & Costa, 2011 
 Rhinolekos capetinga Roxo, L. E. Ochoa, G. S. C. Silva & C. de Oliveira, 2015 
 Rhinolekos garavelloi Martins & Langeani, 2011 
 Rhinolekos schaeferi Martins & Langeani, 2011

References

Loricariidae
Fish of South America
Fish of Brazil
Freshwater fish genera
Catfish genera